Phillip "Greg" Quick (born November 30, 1956) is the defensive line coach for the Montreal Alouettes of the Canadian Football League (CFL). He is formerly a gridiron football player. Quick served as the head football coach at the University of Chicago (1989–1993), St. Norbert College (1994–1998), and Concord University (2003–2008), compiling a career college football record of 48–112. He has also served as the Director of Global Scouting for the CFL. In this capacity, he was responsible for attending combines held in different countries and identifying global players that could play in the CFL.

Head coaching record

References

1956 births
Living people
Baldwin Wallace Yellow Jackets football players
Chicago Maroons football coaches
Concord Mountain Lions football coaches
Edinboro Fighting Scots football coaches
Emporia State Hornets football coaches
Heidelberg Student Princes football coaches
Montreal Alouettes coaches
New Mexico State Aggies football coaches
San Diego Toreros football coaches
Saskatchewan Roughriders coaches
St. Norbert Green Knights football coaches
Toronto Argonauts coaches
National Football League replacement players